Taco Bill is an Australian restaurant chain serving traditional Mexican cuisine. It is the longest founded Mexican franchise in Australia.

History

The restaurant was established in 1967 by Bill Chilcote (16 October 1925 - 11 December 2011) who was married to a Mexican woman from a family who was in the business themselves, owning several cantinas.
He came to Australia from the border of Mexico and California and decided to introduce Mexican food to Australia. The first Taco Bill outlet was opened on the Gold Coast and provided take-away food. Other outlets were opened firstly in Bondi, Sydney and next in Armadale, Melbourne. Currently it has 27 stores in Victoria. Club Taco has over 70.000 active members.

A legal dispute with Taco Bell over the American fast-food chain's planned Australian expansion was resolved in February 2020.

Management

Taco Bill is managed by Tom Kartel, an Iranian native, who arrived in Australia in 1987. He started work as a kitchen hand at Taco Bill's South Melbourne outlet and opened his own restaurant in Springvale in 1994 and secured another two outlets in Clifton Hill and Camberwell over the next four years. Tom bought a 50 percent share of Taco Bill from its owner Stan Teschke in 2002. He received a master's degree in Business Administration (MBA) from Swinburne University.

Food and drink

Taco Bill offers a wide range of traditional Mexican food including tacos, nachos, tortillas, quesadillas, enchiladas, fajitas and burritos. Taco Bill was the first to introduce nachos, tacos, and enchiladas to Australia. It was also the first to introduce the frozen margarita to Australia. The materials are sourced locally from local suppliers (including Aztec Mexican Products and Liquor, Bidfood, G&T Chickens, Merchant Australia, Marino Bros, and Ixom) and many of the spices are imported directly from Mexico. Taco Bill offers Gluten free, vegetarian, and vegan food and provides dietary or allergen options. It bottles its own trademarked hot sauce, and has previously sold its own tequila and beer. A wide range of beverages is offered including the Pancho Villa Margarita which is sold with a free sombrero.

Awards
 Savour Australia Restaurant and Catering Awards for Excellence (2016, 2020)
Lifestyle FOOD Awards (2007, 2009, 2010)

Charity
The Citizen of the Month is held by Taco Bill every month.
It also sponsors several local institutions including schools, colleges and clubs. Among them are:

See also

List of restaurants in Australia
List of Mexican restaurants

References

External links

Restaurants in Melbourne
Restaurants established in 1967
Restaurant chains in Australia
1967 establishments in Australia
Mexican restaurants
Companies based in Melbourne